Prior Pursglove and Stockton Sixth Form College is a sixth form college with sites in Guisborough and Stockton-on-Tees. The college is a result of a merger between Prior Pursglove College and Stockton Sixth Form College in May 2016. The college is led by the Principal (Asma Shaffi) who is accountable to the board of governors.

The college educates around 1,600 students on the Guisborough campus, and 700 students on the Stockton campus.

History 
In 1561, Robert Pursglove set up a free school on the site which would later come to house Prior Pursglove College. The school existed to enable local boys to learn Latin and also served as an Almshouse for twelve local elderly residents. The school and almshouse was reformed in the 1880s to become Guisborough Grammar School, which lasted until 1971 before becoming Prior Pursglove College. Prior Pursglove merged with South Park Sixth Form College in 1997, eventually consolidating the provision of education on to the Guisborough campus.

Prior Pursglove College

Buildings
The oldest building on site was built by architect Alfred Waterhouse in 1887 for Guisborough Grammar School, and is Grade II listed.  A tablet over the archway reads: "Founded in the reign of Queen Elizabeth AD 1561 Guisborough Grammar School re-erected in the reign of Queen Victoria AD 1887". The Waterhouse Building was refurbished in 2013 and now houses Foundation Learning provision. The Coverdale building is named after the creator of the English translated bible and houses humanity and language education.

Construction of a specialist arts & media building was completed in October 2012. The building was named after Guisborough-born Olympic gold medalist Willie Applegarth and was opened by his descendants and Jade Jones, a then-current Prior Pursglove College student who competed at the London Paralympics in 2012.

Other buildings include the Southpark Centre which houses the music, English and drama department and the Priory Centre which houses science, geography, geology, maths, ICT, business studies and psychology. The Prior Centre also contains a Resource Centre where students can spend private study time.

The site is also home to a campus of Askham Bryan College.

Educational provision 
The college mainly specializes in full-time courses for the 16-19 age group, with a wide choice of Advanced level and intermediate courses.

Approximately 1,700 full-time students are enrolled at the college studying a range of courses including AS/A level, BTEC National Diploma and GCSEs.

The college also offers Foundation Learning courses, the Elite Project or Pathways Programme which are designed for 16- to 19-year-olds to help them get back into education, training or employment as well as a number of adult courses.

Students' Union 
The college also has a students' union which is a member of the National Union of Students. The Union is led by a President and Vice President - elected by all students - and who also serve as student members of the  Governing Body. The college has received two awards from the Learning and Skills Improvement Service relating to its student voice provision. In 2011, the college received a Leading the Learner Voice Award in 'Most improved Provider’, for progress in raising the profile of student voice within the college. In 2013 the then-Students' Union President, Darren Melroy, was recognised with a 'Student Governor of the Year' award .

Stockton Sixth Form College 
Stockton Sixth Form College is the sixth form college in Stockton-on-Tees providing a range of A-level, BTEC and GCSE courses to 16-19 students in Stockton and the surrounding area.

The college was established in 1973 after a reorganisation of post-16 education in the Teesside area and is based on one site at Bishopton Road West, two miles from the town centre.

Notable alumni

Prior Pursglove College 

Abi Alton - X Factor Contestant
Sarah Borwell - Tennis Player
Jonny Cocker - Racing Driver
Brad Halliday - Professional Footballer
Johanna Jackson - Commonwealth Champion Race Walker
Rod Liddle - Journalist
Katy Livingston - Modern Pentathlete
Faye Marsay - Actress known for The White Queen (miniseries) and Game of Thrones
Richard Milward - Author
Chris Tomlinson - Long Jumper
David Sharp - Mountaineer whose death on Everest in 2006 sparked controversy 
Jade Jones - Paralympic athlete, wheelchair racing

Guisborough Grammar School 
Alan Appleton - Physicist - Author of "Thermodynamic & Mechancial Properties of Matter" & "The Whitby Timeline"
Eric Garrett - Opera Singer (1931-2009)
Robert Holman - Dramatist
Dave Nellist - Politician
Derek Thompson - Sports Commentator
Keith Williams - former British Airways chairman and CEO

Stockton Sixth Form College 

Bethany Bryan - Junior Team GB Athlete, Rowing
Paul Smith - Musician, Maximo Park
Dave Robson - Race Engineer, Williams F1
Callum Woodhouse - Actor known for The Durrells 
Helen Hammill - Musician, Cattle & Cane
Allison Curbishley - BBC Five Live

References

External links

 
 
 Official site
 College Virtual Learning Environment

Education in Redcar and Cleveland
Sixth form colleges in North Yorkshire
Guisborough
Sixth form colleges in County Durham
Education in the Borough of Stockton-on-Tees
Educational institutions established in 1971
1971 establishments in England
Educational institutions established in 1973
1973 establishments in England